Luke 'big fella' Pilkington (born 12 July 1990 in Canberra, Australia) is an Australian footballer, well known for winning the Foxtel Reality Television Show Football Superstar.

Club career
Pilkington was previously the captain of Australian National University Football Club. As a result of his victory on Football Superstar, Luke was awarded a contract with A-League franchise, Melbourne Victory F.C. He was also awarded a scholarship with Monash University, one of Australia's premier sporting universities. Pilkington made his first team debut for Melbourne Victory on 27 December 2009 in an A League match against North Queensland Fury, he has also been a regular fixture in their youth side. He also came on as a substitute in an Asian Champions League match in April 2010.

References

1990 births
Living people
Australian soccer players
A-League Men players
National Premier Leagues players
Melbourne Victory FC players
Association football defenders
Association football midfielders